Jorge Armando Piñero da Silva (born 24 June 1987) is an Argentine professional footballer who plays as a forward for Club Cipolletti.

Career
Piñero da Silva spent the early years of his senior career in Torneo Argentino C with CAI de Trelew and Deportivo MacAllister. In 2006, Piñero da Silva joined Comodoro Rivadavia's CAI. He remained for four years in Primera B Nacional, scoring twenty-six goals in one hundred and eleven fixtures; notably netting twelve in 2009–10. 2010 saw Piñero da Silva sign for Primera División side Godoy Cruz. His debut came on 11 September versus Lanús, as he was subbed on in place of David Ramírez. Three further substitute appearances arrived for the club, prior to Piñero da Silva leaving on loan to Aldosivi for the 2011–12 season.

Having spent 2012–13 with Patronato, Piñero da Silva sealed a return to CAI; now of Torneo Argentino A. He scored seventeen goals in the subsequent campaign, which included a hat-trick over Alvarado in February 2014. Five months later, on 1 July 2014, Piñero da Silva completed a move to Guaraní Antonio Franco of Primera B Nacional. Thirty-three matches and five goals occurred as they suffered relegation. In 2016, Deportivo Madryn of the third tier signed Piñero da Silva. He scored three braces whilst with the Puerto Madryn outfit, one in a victory over Deportivo Roca and on separate occasions at home against Villa Mitre.

Piñero da Silva agreed terms with Cipolletti in July 2017. He scored eleven times, four in the Copa Argentina, throughout the 2017–18 Torneo Federal A, though would depart towards the end after signing for Bolivian Primera División team Nacional Potosí. He didn't appear in the league for them, though did make appearances in the Copa Sudamericana versus Fluminense. Piñero da Silva returned to Argentina with Barracas Central on 7 July 2018; just three months after signing for Nacional Potosí. He made his bow on 25 August versus Almirante Brown. They were promoted to tier two in his first year.

Career statistics
.

Honours
Barracas Central
Primera B Metropolitana: 2018–19

References

External links

1987 births
Living people
Sportspeople from Misiones Province
Argentine footballers
Association football forwards
Argentine expatriate footballers
Expatriate footballers in Bolivia
Argentine expatriate sportspeople in Bolivia
Torneo Argentino C players
Primera Nacional players
Argentine Primera División players
Torneo Argentino A players
Torneo Federal A players
Bolivian Primera División players
Primera B Metropolitana players
Comisión de Actividades Infantiles footballers
Godoy Cruz Antonio Tomba footballers
Aldosivi footballers
Club Atlético Patronato footballers
Guaraní Antonio Franco footballers
Deportivo Madryn players
Club Cipolletti footballers
Nacional Potosí players
Barracas Central players